Babylon Zoo were an English rock band formed in 1992 in Wolverhampton. Their song "Spaceman" gained considerable exposure through its use in a Levi's jeans television advert in the United Kingdom in late 1995. Released as the band's debut single on 21 January 1996, it entered the UK Singles Chart at number one. "Spaceman" led to the band being considered a one-hit wonder; they had little success with any subsequent releases.

History
Frontman Jas Mann had formerly been in an indie music band, called The Sandkings. In 1993, a three-track demo earned him a contract from Phonogram Records for his next project, Babylon Zoo, but ended up being signed to Warners' WEA record label where the band recorded the album The Boy with the X-Ray Eyes. However around this time Clive Black, the Managing Director of Warners, was poached by rival record company EMI and so took Babylon Zoo over to EMI.
 
The band's first single was the song "Spaceman" which had been recorded and pressed by Warners as a CD single, before being scrapped when Black left the company. However, a promo version was played on a Manchester radio station, where an advertising agency creative heard it and decided it would be perfect for a Levi's jeans TV advert they were developing. Levi's used part of "Spaceman" for their UK TV ad and so the hook of the song became popular. Even though the rest of the song turned into slower grunge-glam track, it still became the fastest-selling debut single in British history. The single sold 383,000 copies in the first week of release, spending 5 weeks at number 1.

Critic Steven Wells wrote that the "Spaceman" single (resembling the Levi's advert version for only "about ten seconds") angered many consumers. He reported that Mann drew further ire through self-aggrandising interviews, and noted his ridicule in the media, including from the NME and in a 1997 episode of comedy TV series Brass Eye.

Tim Moore wrote that "only failure and embarrassment" followed for Babylon Zoo. An album entitled The Boy with the X-Ray Eyes was produced at Mann's New Atlantis Productions music and video centre. It peaked at number 6 on the UK Albums Chart on 17 February, but quickly dropped out of the Top 40, lasting only a further two weeks on the chart. Subsequent singles charted progressively lower, failing to match the success of "Spaceman". The band's reputation was further damaged by a series of scathing live reviews.

In 1999, a follow-up album was released, King Kong Groover. The album received negative reviews and sold fewer than 10,000 units, failing to chart in the UK. The singles from the album were "All The Money's Gone", which was released in the UK and Europe and peaked at number 46 on the UK Singles Chart. The second single, a cover of Mott the Hoople's "Honaloochie Boogie", was only released as a promotional single in France. The group disbanded shortly after and Mann moved to India where he spent time working for an aid agency.

In 2005, Jas Mann announced he would be issuing a new Babylon Zoo album, called Cold Clockwork Doll, though no official release date was ever announced and no further updates followed.

Musical style and influences
Many critics and journalists felt that Babylon Zoo was influenced by David Bowie's musical style. As such, the band can be seen as a 90's alternative rock band of the time with glam and electronic influences.

Discography

Albums

Singles

See also
 List of residents of Wolverhampton

References

External links
 
 

English rock music groups
Musical groups established in 1992
Musical groups disestablished in 2000
Musicians from Wolverhampton
Musical groups from West Midlands (county)
1992 establishments in England
EMI Records artists
Phonogram Inc. artists
Warner Records artists